Neil Ripley Ker  (1908–1982) was a scholar of Anglo-Saxon literature. He was Reader in Palaeography at the University of Oxford and a fellow of Magdalen College, Oxford until he retired in 1968. He is known especially for his Catalogue of Manuscripts Containing Anglo-Saxon, which is praised as a milestone in Anglo-Saxon manuscript study.

Biography
Ker was born in Brompton, London, and was educated at Eton College and Magdalen College, Oxford, completing a BA in English Language and Literature in 1931 and a BLitt in 1933. During the Second World War he was a conscientious objector.

In 1945 he was elected a fellow of Magdalen College and in 1946 University Reader in Palaeography. In 1968 he retired from his roles at Oxford to focus on his largest work, Medieval Manuscripts in British Libraries. He completed the first two volumes and most of the third and left a draft of the fourth.

Legacy
Annually, the British Academy awards grants in Ker's name to scholars who publish books "that include analysis of the distinctive features of original manuscripts."

Publications (selected)
1941: Medieval Libraries of Great Britain
1954 Fragments of Medieval Manuscripts Used as Pastedowns in Oxford Bindings
1957: Catalogue of Manuscripts Containing Anglo-Saxon
1960: English Manuscripts in the Century after the Norman Conquest
1964: Medieval Libraries of Great Britain; 2nd ed.
1969: Medieval Manuscripts in British Libraries; vol. 1
1977: Medieval Manuscripts in British Libraries; vol. 2

References

Further reading

External links
Neil Ripley Ker on WorldCat

Anglo-Saxon studies scholars
British medievalists
English palaeographers
1908 births
1982 deaths
People educated at Eton College
Alumni of Magdalen College, Oxford
Fellows of Magdalen College, Oxford
Commanders of the Order of the British Empire
Fellows of the British Academy